Lukáš Kříž (born August 18, 1993) is a Czech professional ice hockey player. He is currently playing for Chevaliers du lac d'Annecy of the FFHG Division 2.

Kříž made his Czech Extraliga debut playing with Motor České Budějovice during the 2011-12 Czech Extraliga season. He also played for MsHK Žilina of the Tipsport Liga.

References

External links

1993 births
Living people
Motor České Budějovice players
Czech ice hockey defencemen
KLH Vajgar Jindřichův Hradec players
HC Most players
IHC Písek players
Sportspeople from České Budějovice
HC Tábor players
MsHK Žilina players
Czech expatriate ice hockey players in Slovakia
Expatriate ice hockey players in France
Czech expatriate sportspeople in France